Gbantu is the Sanga Local Government Area headquarters, in southern Kaduna state in the Middle Belt region of Nigeria. It is also the Gwantu Chiefdom headquarters. The town has a post office, with a postal code 801.

External links
 Air quality in Gwantu

See also
 List of villages in Kaduna State

References

Populated places in Kaduna State